John J. Mullen can refer to:
 John J. Mullen (American football), American football coach
 John J. Mullen (mayor), American politician